Simone Bignall is an Australian philosopher. She is Senior Researcher in Jumbunna Indigenous Nations and Collaborative Futures Hub at the University of Technology Sydney. 

Bignall completed her doctoral degree in Philosophy at the University of Sydney in 2007, supervised by Professor Moira Gatens. In 2010 she received a postdoctoral award and subsequently was appointed a Faculty Lecturer in Philosophy at the University of New South Wales. She joined the Office of Indigenous Strategy and Engagement at Flinders University of South Australia before taking up her current role at the University of Technology Sydney in 2019.

Bignall's primary research interests fall within the field of postcolonial political philosophy, informed particularly by her work with Indigenous peoples engaged in sovereign Nation-building for self-determination and treaty. Her publications typically seek alliances between Indigenous Australian and contemporary European philosophies, aiming to find shared conceptual orientations. Her academic work is guided by a particular interest in the philosophical lineage from Spinoza to Deleuze and traverses critical posthumanism and continental philosophy, anarchism, colonial and postcolonial politics and culture, theories of embodiment and agency, feminism and ethics. 

With Larissa Behrendt, Daryle Rigney and Linda Tuhiwai Smith, Bignall is founding co-editor of the book series Indigenous Nations and Collaborative Futures, published by Rowman and Littlefield International. She also co-edits the Rowman and Littlefield series on  Continental Philosophy in Austral-Asia. She is a former Chair of the Australasian Society for Continental Philosophy (2016-2018). Dr Bignall is best known for her research on system transformations, particularly in relation to the politics of Decolonisation and Postcolonialism. She appears regularly as a curator and lecturer for Professor Rosi Braidotti's annual Summer School on Posthumanism at the University of Utrecht and participates in international projects funded by research organisations based in Canada, Australia and the United Kingdom.

Books
 Postcolonial Agency: Critique and Constructivism (Edinburgh 2010)
 Deleuze and the Postcolonial (with Paul R. Patton, 2010)
 Agamben and Colonialism (with Marcelo Svirsky, 2012)
 Deleuze and Pragmatism (with Sean Bowden and Paul R. Patton, 2014)
 Posthuman Ecologies (with Rosi Braidotti, 2018)
 Excolonialism: Ethics after Enjoyment, forthcoming

External links
 Simone Bignall
 Simone Bignall, Google Scholar

Phenomenologists
Continental philosophers
Philosophy academics
Spinoza scholars
Living people
Academic staff of Flinders University
University of Sydney alumni
Year of birth missing (living people)
Presidents of the Australasian Society for Continental Philosophy
University of Adelaide alumni
Australian women philosophers
Australian philosophers